Grand Prix des Amériques was a classic one-day cycling race that took place in Montreal as part of the UCI Road World Cup. It was held between 1988 and 1992.

Winners 

UCI Road World Cup races
Cycle races in Canada
Recurring sporting events established in 1988
Recurring sporting events disestablished in 1992
Defunct cycling races in Canada
1988 establishments in Canada
1992 disestablishments in Canada
Sport in Montreal